Stadion Tsentralnyi (or Central City Stadium) is a stadium in Mykolaiv, Ukraine, which was built in 1965. Currently it has a capacity of 16,700, in an all-seater configuration. It is the home stadium of the football club MFK Mykolaiv.

References
www.mfk.mykolayiv.com
www.worldstadiums.com
www.fussballtempel.net

1965 establishments in Ukraine
Sport in Mykolaiv
Football venues in Ukraine
Buildings and structures in Mykolaiv
Sports venues in Mykolaiv Oblast